Zhao Lixin (born August 29, 1968), male, from Zhengzhou, Henan, Swedish Chinese film and television actor, drama actor, voice actor, and show host.

Biographical record

Because his father worked in Xinhua Bookstore, Zhao Lixin had been exposed to a large number of books when he was a child, and he began to try recitations and performances in high school. At the age of 18, he was admitted to the Central Academy of Drama. Because of the better sound conditions, he often took on the dubbing work with his senior brother Zhang Hanyu when he was in school. At the end of his sophomore year, he was selected to go to the All-Soviet National Film University in Moscow for further study. After graduating from the Central Academy of Drama, Zhao Lixin applied for the Directing Department of the Moscow Film Academy and graduated in 1995 with a master's degree in that department. Later, he brought a recommendation letter from his tutor to Stockholm and was admitted to the Royal Swedish Theater, becoming the first Chinese actor to appear on stage since the establishment of the theater.

In 2001, he starred in the modern historical TV series Towards the Republic directed by Zhang Li, as a member of the Senate, Luo Wen joined the line. In 2010, he played the actor Li Xia in the TV series The Electric Wave That Never Dies. In 2015, he played the role of Chen Qiqian, an assistant engineer of the 202 factory, He won the Magnolia Award for Best Supporting Actor in the 22nd Shanghai TV Festival. At the beginning of 2018, it became popular again due to its outstanding performance in the variety show Sound on the Scene.

Filmography

Television series

Movie

Drama

Screenwriter

TV series My Past in China.

Dispute 
In early April 2019, Zhao Lixin posted on Sina Weibo, "Why did the Japanese occupy Beijing for eight years, why didn't they snatch the cultural relics from the Forbidden City and burn the Forbidden City? Is this in line with the nature of the invaders?", "Why did the British and French coalition forces burn the Old Summer Palace?" and other remarks. It attracted the attention of many netizens and was questioned as absolving the Japanese aggressor. Subsequently, the official media such as Ziguangge, the Central Committee of the Communist Youth League, China Anti-cult and other official media criticized Zhao Lixin's views. After the public outcry, Zhao Lixin deleted the related controversial Weibo and issued a statement of apology on April 3. Shortly after (April 6), his personal Weibo was cancelled, and his studio official Weibo also deleted all content. Sina "Weibo Administrator" announced on the afternoon of April 16 that a batch of accounts that posted harmful information about current affairs had been investigated and dealt with, including Weibo of actor Zhao Lixin.

References

1968 births
Living people
Chinese television actors
Chinese film directors
Chinese male voice actors
Chinese male television actors